John Larsen (born 23 September 1943) is a Canadian rower. He competed in the men's eight event at the 1964 Summer Olympics.

References

1943 births
Living people
Canadian male rowers
Olympic rowers of Canada
Rowers at the 1964 Summer Olympics
Place of birth missing (living people)